The Bulgaria women's national volleyball team represents Bulgaria in international women's volleyball competitions and is controlled by the Bulgarian Volleyball Federation. The team's successes includes winning the Balkan Championship in 1982, and runners-up at the 1970 Summer Universidade along with bronze at the 1980 Summer Olympics. The national team's biggest success came in 1981, winning the European title at home in Sofia.

Competition results
 Champions   Runner-Up   Semi-Finals   Other Top Results

Summer Olympics
 1964 — Did not qualify
 1968 — Did not qualify
 1972 — Did not qualify
 1976 — Did not qualify
 1980 —  Bronze Medal
 1984 — Did not qualify
 1988 — Did not qualify
 1992 — Did not qualify
 1996 — Did not qualify
 2000 — Did not qualify
 2004 — Did not qualify
 2008 — Did not qualify
 2012 — Did not qualify
 2016 — Did not qualify
 2020 — Did not qualify

FIVB World Championship
 1952 — 4th Place 
 1956 — 5th Place 
 1960 — Did not qualify
 1962 — 6th Place 
 1967 — Did not qualify
 1970 — 6th Place (as host)
 1974 — 13th Place 
 1978 — 9th Place 
 1982 — 9th Place 
 1986 — 12th Place 
 1990 — Did not qualify
 1994 — Did not qualify
 1998 — 11th Place 
 2002 — 8th Place 
 2006 — Did not qualify
 2010 — Did not qualify
 2014 — 11th Place 
 2018 — 12th Place
 2022 — 17th Place

FIVB World Cup
 1973 — Did not qualify
 1977 — Did not qualify
 1981 — 7th place
 1985 to 2019 — Did not qualify

FIVB World Grand Prix
 2013 — 9th Place 
 2014 — 21st Place 
 2015 — 17th Place 
 2016 — 16th Place 
 2017 — 17th Place

FIVB Volleyball Nations League
 2018 - Did not qualify
 2019 - 16th place
 2020 - Cancelled
 2021 - Did not qualify
 2022 - 14th place

European Championship
 1949 — Did not qualify
 1950 — 4th place (as host)
 1951 — Did not qualify
 1955 — 5th place
 1958 — 5th place
 1963 — 5th place
 1967 — 6th place
 1971 — 4th place
 1975 — 4th place
 1977 — 7th place
 1979 —  Bronze Medal
 1981 —  Gold Medal (as host)
 1983 — 4th place
 1985 — 10th place
 1987 — 4th place
 1989 — 7th place
 1991 — 7th place
 1993 — 9th place
 1995 — 5th place
 1997 — 4th place
 1999 — 7th place
 2001 —  Bronze Medal
 2003 — 7th place
 2005 — 9th place
 2007 — 11th place
 2009 — 8th place
 2011 — 14th place
 2013 — 13th place
 2015 — 13th place
 2017 — 9th place
 2019 — 8th place
 2021 — 9th place (as co-host)

European League

FIVB Volleyball Women's Challenger Cup

Balkan Championship

Summer Universidade

Current squad
The following is the Bulgarian roster in the 2018 World Championship.

Head coach: Ivan Petkov

See also
Bulgaria women's team
Bulgaria women's U18 team
Bulgaria women's U20 team
Bulgaria women's U23 team
Bulgaria men's team

References

External links
Official website
FIVB profile

National women's volleyball teams
Volleyball
Volleyball in Bulgaria